Artoffact Records is a Canadian/Icelandic record label that concentrates on industrial, postpunk, heavy metal, and electronic music. The label was founded in 1999.

History
In 1997, Jacek Kozlowski laid the groundwork for Artoffact Records.

In June 2013, the label put on a live showcase performance of some of its bands, including Prospero, Encephalon, and Legend.

Artists on this label 

3Teeth
Absurd Minds
Actors
Aesthetic Perfection
Alice in Videoland
Apoptygma Berzerk
Ayria
Blank
Bootblacks
Cabaret
Cat Rapes Dog
cEvin Key
Cloud Rat
Coil
Colony 5
Controlled Bleeding
Dawn of Ashes
Dead Quiet
Dead When I Found Her
Devours
Download
Encephalon
GGGOLDDD
Ghost Twin
Headless Nameless
Headscan
Individual Totem
Interlace
Jesus on Extasy
Juno Reactor
KANGA
Kælan Mikla
Kauan
Kobold
Leathers
LEGEND
Marsheaux
Massiv in Mensch
Mlada Fronta
Moksha
Monster Movie
Nash the Slash
Netz
Noise Unit
Öhm
ÖTZI
Ovo
Ploho
Prospero
Psyche
Ploho
Rational Youth
Reptilicus
Ritual Dictates
Saltillo
Seeming
Seer 
Solo Ansamblis
SÓLVEIG MATTHILDUR
Spectres
Standeg
Strategy
Steril
THE FOREIGN RESORT
Trylok
Tunic
Urceus Exit
 V▲LH▲LL
Wingtips
ЧЕРНАЯ РЕЧКА (BLACK RIVER)

See also
 List of record labels

References

External links
 Official site

Record labels established in 1997
Canadian independent record labels
Industrial record labels
Electronic music record labels
1997 establishments in Ontario
Companies based in Toronto